Johan Wilfred John "Mick" Mibus, known as Wilfred Mibus or Mick Mibus (14 September 1900 – 18 April 1964) was an Australian politician. He was a Country Party representative of the electoral district of Lowan (called Borung from 1945 to 1955) from 1944 until his death in 1964.

Early life
Wilfred Mibus was born in 1900 in the small settlement of Katyil, near Dimboola, Victoria, to pioneer farmer Carl August Mibus and his wife Mathilda Nuske. Mibus studied for the Lutheran ministry at Concordia College in Adelaide, South Australia. He also attempted three years of a medical degree at the University of Melbourne, but gave up his studies due to severe asthma.

Political career
Mibus worked as a campaign manager for his friend, Hamilton Lamb, who was the Member for Lowan from 1935 until 1943. Lamb died as a prisoner of war in a Japanese internment camp on the Burma Railway, and in his will, recommended that Mibus replace him in Lowan. Mibus was duly elected at the Lowan by-election on 4 November 1944.

In 1949, Mibus was one of six Country MPs who defected to the Liberal and Country Party formed by Thomas Hollway from the Victorian division of the Liberal Party. The Country Party branded Mibus a "rebel" for his actions, and ran a Country candidate against him in Borung at the 1950 state election. Mibus was re-elected, and stated that the electors of Borung had endorsed his change of parties.

Mibus died in office on 18 April 1964. He left an estate worth £A38,902 to his widow Dora, his son and his daughter. No by-election was held for Lowan as a state election was held on 27 June that year, with Jim McCabe retaining the seat for the Liberal and Country Party.

References

External links
Parliamentary Biography

|-

|-

1900 births
1964 deaths
Members of the Victorian Legislative Assembly
National Party of Australia members of the Parliament of Victoria
Australian farmers
Australian Lutherans
20th-century Australian politicians
20th-century Lutherans